Davidiella carinthiaca is a fungal plant pathogen infecting red clover.

References

External links 
 Index Fungorum
 USDA ARS Fungal Database

Fungal tree pathogens and diseases
Davidiellaceae
Fungi described in 2006